Spiryutino is a rural locality (a village) in Nikolskoye Rural Settlement, Kaduysky District, Vologda Oblast, Russia. The population was 26 as of 2002.

Geography 
Spiryutino is located 18 km northeast of Kaduy (the district's administrative centre) by road. Boylovo is the nearest rural locality.

References 

Rural localities in Kaduysky District